Prime Defender (30 March 2004 – 24 July 2012) was a British Thoroughbred racehorse.

Background
Prime Defender was a chestnut horse with a white blaze bred by Christopher J Mason. He was one of the best horses sired by Bertolini a "high class sprinter" who won the July Stakes in 1998. He was trained by Barry Hills in Lambourn and owned by friends Steve Falle, Matt Franklin and James Sumsion.

Racing career
As a three-year-old, Prime Defender won the European Free Handicap at Newmarket Racecourse in April and the Sandy Lane Stakes at Haydock Park in May. After a long break without a major win he won the Cammidge Trophy at Doncaster in March 2009. He recorded his most important victory as a six-year-old in August 2010 when he won the Group Two (Duke of York Stakes). Prime Defender holds the juvenile and overall track record at Wolverhampton.

Stud career
Prime Defender was retired to Hedgeholme Stud in County Durham at the end of the 2011, but after having fertility problems he was returned to training the following year with the Nottinghamshire trainer Michael Appleby. He was being prepared for a return to racing when he died of a heart attack in a training gallop on 24 July 2012.

Pedigree

References

 Prime Defender's record from Racing Post 

2004 racehorse births
2012 racehorse deaths
Racehorses bred in the United Kingdom
Racehorses trained in the United Kingdom
Thoroughbred family 4-o